Alessandro Mordacci (Parma, 16 December 1997) is an Italian rugby union player. His usual position is as a Flanker and he currently plays for Rugby Colorno in Top10. 

Under contract with Top12 team Valorugby Emilia, in 2018–19 Pro14 and 2020–21 Pro14season, he was named Additional Player for Zebre.
He had the role of Captain for Valorugby Emilia from season 2019-2020 to 2021−2022.

References

External links 
It's Rugby England Profile
Ultimate Rugby Profile

Sportspeople from Parma
Italian rugby union players
Zebre Parma players
1997 births
Living people
Valorugby Emilia players
Rugby union flankers